Samuel Glenn Semakor, popularly known as GlennSamm, is a Ghanaian walking artiste and fashion model. After his appearance at the 2018 Afrochella Festival and the 2019 Chale Wote Festival, GlennSamm caught attention when he was featured in Vogue magazine and a BBC documentary.

Early life and education 
GlennSamm was born in Accra, schooled in Sogakofe Senior High School and Exopa Modelling School. He further studied Graphic Design at IPMC College of Technology. He belongs to the Anlo Ewe people from Keta.

Career 
GlennSamm was named "Fashion Personality of the Year" in 2019 at the Youth Excellence Awards. In 2019 he was appointed brand ambassador of Caveman watches. He was featured in the Vogue Magazine and has also starred in music videos including New African Girl from Fuse ODG and Every Day from Manuel NonBada.

Discography 

 Africa (feat. Kamo Smash)

References 

Living people
Walking artists
People from Accra
Male models
Ewe people
Year of birth missing (living people)